Edmundo Murray (born 1955 in Buenos Aires), is an Argentine author, born in a family of mixed Colombian, Irish and Swiss roots. He has published widely on Irish-Latin American relations, art and diplomacy, and links between food and music.

Biography
Edmundo Murray studied in Argentina, Switzerland and the United States. He obtained a PhD in Latin American literature from University of Zurich (Romanisches Seminar), and a M.A. from University of Geneva. He is a lecturer and frequent contributor of articles in cultural history, regional cultural integration and Irish and Latin American studies. He is a Founding Member of the Society for Irish Latin American Studies, and member of the Swiss Society of Americanists. Founder and first editor of "Irish Migration Studies in Latin America", a journal focusing on relations between Ireland and Latin America. Visiting professor at University of Cape Verde. Research consultant of the West Africa Institute. Advisory Board member and contributor to "Ireland and the Americas: Culture, Politics, and History" (Santa Barbara, CA: ABC-CLIO, 2008). Poet and a short-story writer, he published "Poemas Nómades" (1999) and "Taxonomía Fantástica de los Árboles de Buenos Aires" (2000). From 2001 to 2020, Murray worked as publishing officer at WTO Publications, the in-house publisher of the World Trade Organization. He is married to Estelle Varanguien de Villepin and father of five. He currently lives in Granada, Spain.

Works 
Symphony of Flavors: Food and Music in Concert (Newcastle: Cambridge Scholars Publishing, 2015). Editor.
Intégration régionale en Afrique de l´Ouest (Praia: West Africa Institute, 2014), with Abdarahmane Ngaïdé, Kalie Sillah, Bio Goura Soule, and Olumuyiwa Alaba.
Centre William Rappard: Home of the World Trade Organization, Geneva (Geneva: WTO, 2011), with Joëlle Kuntz, also published in French and Spanish.
Becoming gauchos ingleses: Diasporic Models in Irish-Argentine Literature (Palo Alto: Academica Press, 2009).
Becoming Irlandés: Private Narratives of the Irish Emigration to Argentina 1844-1912 (Buenos Aires: L.O.L.A. Literature of Latin America, 2006). Revised edition.
Devenir irlandés: Narrativas íntimas de la emigración irlandesa a la Argentina 1844-1912 (Buenos Aires: Eudeba, 2004).

See also
Irish Migration Studies in Latin America

Sources
Coghlan, Eduardo A. Los irlandeses en Argentina: su actuación y descendencia (Buenos Aires, 1987).
Society for Irish Latin American Studies. About SILAS ([www.irlandeses.org]), cited 21 January 2010.

1955 births
Argentine male writers
Argentine people of Irish descent
Argentine people of Swiss descent
Latin Americanists
Living people
University of Geneva alumni
Writers from Buenos Aires
Writers from Geneva